Clederson César de Souza (born 14 July 1979), known as just César, is a Brazilian former professional footballer who played as a left winger.

Career
He was part of the 2005–06 and 2006–07 Swiss Championship winning team, FC Zürich. On 31 January 2010, Al-Ahli Dubai signed the Brazilian midfielder from Hertha BSC until the end of the season.

Honours
 Swiss Super League: 2005–06, 2006–07
 Swiss Cup: 2004–05
 UAE President cup: 2007–08
 UAE Supercup: 2008
 UAE Professional League Etisalat: 2008–09

References

External links
 
 

Living people
1979 births
Brazilian footballers
Association football midfielders
Santos FC players
Sport Club Internacional players
Associação Portuguesa de Desportos players
FC Zürich players
Al Ahli Club (Dubai) players
Hertha BSC players
Swiss Super League players
Bundesliga players
UAE Pro League players
Brazilian expatriate footballers
Brazilian expatriate sportspeople in Switzerland
Expatriate footballers in Switzerland
Brazilian expatriate sportspeople in Germany
Expatriate footballers in Germany
Brazilian expatriate sportspeople in the United Arab Emirates
Expatriate footballers in the United Arab Emirates
Sportspeople from Santos, São Paulo